The Parkdale Baptist Church (also known as First Baptist Missionary Church of Parkdale) is a historic Baptist church building at 137 Bride Street in Parkdale, Arkansas.  The Late Gothic Revival style building was constructed in 1910, and is one of comparatively few buildings in southeastern Arkansas in that style.  The building follows a modified cruciform plan.  Its main Gothic Revival features include the pointed arch windows that predominate, twin towers, and gable ends with patterned-glass windows.

The church was listed on the National Register of Historic Places (as "Parkdale Baptist Church-AS0051") in 2007.

See also
National Register of Historic Places listings in Ashley County, Arkansas

References

Baptist churches in Arkansas
Churches on the National Register of Historic Places in Arkansas
Gothic Revival church buildings in Arkansas
Churches completed in 1910
Churches in Ashley County, Arkansas
National Register of Historic Places in Ashley County, Arkansas
1910 establishments in Arkansas